Mateus Moreira (died 3 October 1645) is a Brazilian martyr of the Catholic Church. He was beatified on March 5, 2000 and canonized on October 15, 2017, along with the other Martyrs of Natal.

Biography
Mateus Moreira was a layman who was at Mass on October 3, 1645 when Dutch government troops under the command of Jacob Rabbi executed all the faithful who were at Sunday Mass, presided over by Ambrósio Francisco Ferro who was also martyred. Mateus Moreira had his heart torn in his back as he exclaimed, "Praise the Blessed Sacrament."

Beatification
The celebration was held in St. Peter's Square in the Vatican in the presence of the bishop of Natal, Mossoró and Caicó, and about a thousand Brazilians.

Patron of Extraordinary Ministers
At the 43rd General Assembly of the CNBB in Itaici/São Paulo in 2005, Mateus Moreira was stated as "Patron of the Extraordinary Ministers of the Eucharistic Communion". In December 2005, the CNBB reported that the Holy See's Congregation for Divine Worship and the Discipline of the Sacraments had approved the Moreira as the patron of ministers.

References

External links
 Roman Catholic  Archdiocese of Natal Page

1645 deaths
Brazilian Roman Catholic saints
Beatifications by Pope John Paul II
Canonizations by Pope Francis